Finding Dory is a 2016 American computer-animated comedy-drama adventure film produced by Pixar Animation Studios and released by Walt Disney Pictures. Directed by Andrew Stanton, produced by Lindsey Collins and written by Stanton and Victoria Strouse, the film is the sequel to Finding Nemo (2003). Ellen DeGeneres and Albert Brooks reprise their roles from the first film, with Hayden Rolence (replacing Alexander Gould), Ed O'Neill, Kaitlin Olson, Ty Burrell, Diane Keaton and Eugene Levy joining the cast. The film focuses on the amnesiac fish Dory (DeGeneres), who journeys to be reunited with her parents (Keaton and Levy).

Disney planned to make a sequel to Finding Nemo since 2005, tasking its new studio Circle 7 Animation after disagreements with Pixar. Though it never went into production, a script was uploaded to the official Raindance Film Festival website that includes elements of the unmade script. Disney's acquisition of Pixar in early 2006 led to the cancellation of Circle 7's version of the film. A Pixar-made sequel was announced in April 2013 as the schedule for a November 2015 release. The fictional Marine Life Institute depicted extensively in the film is based on the production team's research trips to the Monterey Bay Aquarium, the Marine Mammal Center and the Vancouver Aquarium. Thomas Newman returned to compose the score.

Finding Dory premiered at the El Capitan Theatre in Los Angeles on June 8, 2016, and was released in theaters in the United States on June 17. It was praised by critics for its animation, emotional weight, voice acting and humor. It earned $1.029 billion worldwide, finishing its theatrical run as the third-highest-grossing film of 2016 and the fourth-highest-grossing animated film of all time. Finding Dory set numerous box office records, including the biggest opening for an animated film in North America and the highest-grossing animated film in North America.

Plot

Dory, the regal blue tang, got separated from her parents, Jenny and Charlie, as a child. As she grew up, Dory attempted to search for them, but gradually forgot them due to her short-term memory loss. Later, she joined Marlin the clownfish, looking for Nemo.

One year after meeting Marlin and Nemo, Dory is living with them in their reef. One day, Dory has a flashback and remembers her parents. She decides to look for them, but her memory problem is an obstacle. She suddenly remembers that they lived at the "Jewel of Morro Bay, California" across the ocean when Nemo mentions the name.

Marlin and Nemo accompany Dory on her journey. With the help of Crush, their sea turtle friend, they ride the California Current to California. Upon arrival, they explore a shipwreck full of lost cargo, where Dory accidentally awakens a giant Humboldt squid that pursues them and almost devours Nemo. They manage to trap the squid and Marlin chastises Dory for endangering them. Dory travels to the surface to seek help, where she is captured by staff members from the Marine Life Institute.

Dory is placed in quarantine and tagged. There she meets a grouchy seven-legged octopus named Hank. Dory's tag marks her for transfer to an aquarium in Cleveland, Ohio. Hank, who fears being released back into the ocean, agrees to help Dory find her parents in exchange for her tag. In one exhibit, Dory encounters her childhood friend Destiny, a nearsighted whale shark, who used to communicate with Dory through pipes, and Bailey, a beluga whale, who mistakenly believes he has lost his ability to echolocate. Dory subsequently has flashbacks of life with her parents and struggles to recall details. She finally remembers how she was separated from her parents: she overheard her mother crying one night, left to retrieve a shell to cheer her up, and was pulled away by an undertow current out into the ocean.

Marlin and Nemo attempt to rescue Dory. With the help of two lazy California sea lions named Fluke and Rudder and a common loon named Becky, they manage to get into the institute and find her in the pipe system. Other blue tangs tell them that Dory's parents escaped from the institute a long time ago to search for her and never came back, leaving Dory to believe that they are dead. Hank retrieves Dory from the tank, accidentally leaving Marlin and Nemo behind. He is then apprehended by one of the employees and unintentionally drops Dory into the drain, flushing her out to the ocean. While wandering aimlessly, she comes across a trail of shells; remembering that when she was young, her parents had set out a similar trail to help her find her way back home, she follows it. At the end of the trail, Dory finds an empty brain coral with multiple shell trails leading to it. As she turns to leave, her parents arrive. They tell her they spent years laying down the trails for her to follow in the hopes that she would eventually find them.

Marlin, Nemo, and Hank end up in the truck taking various aquatic creatures to Cleveland. Destiny and Bailey escape from their exhibit to help Dory rescue them. Once onboard the truck, Dory persuades Hank to return to the sea with her, and together, they hijack the truck and drive it over busy highways, creating havoc, before crashing it into the sea, freeing all the fish. Dory, along with her parents and new friends, returns to the reef with Marlin and Nemo. Hank begins to adapt a happy lifestyle in the ocean and also becomes a teacher for Nemo's school.

In a post-credits scene, the Tank Gang (from Finding Nemo), still trapped inside their plastic bags, reach California one year after floating across the Pacific Ocean, where they are picked up by staff members from the Marine Life Institute.

Voice cast 

 Ellen DeGeneres as  Dory, a regal blue tang, who suffers from short-term memory loss.
 Sloane Murray as young Dory. Murray is the 7-year-old daughter of producer Lindsey Collins.
 Lucia Geddes as teen Dory.
 Albert Brooks as Marlin, an overprotective ocellaris clownfish, Nemo's father and Dory's friend.
 Hayden Rolence as Nemo, a young optimistic clownfish who is Marlin's son.
 Ed O'Neill as Hank, a cranky but well-meaning East Pacific red octopus, who is called a "septopus", having lost a tentacle.
 Kaitlin Olson as Destiny, a nearsighted whale shark who was Dory's childhood friend.
 Ty Burrell as Bailey, a beluga whale, who temporarily lost echolocation due to a concussion.
 Diane Keaton as Jenny, Dory's mother.
 Eugene Levy as Charlie, Dory's father.
 Idris Elba as Fluke, a California sea lion who is Rudder's friend.
 Dominic West as Rudder, a California sea lion who is Fluke's friend.
 Bob Peterson as Mr. Ray, a spotted eagle ray who is Nemo's schoolteacher.
 Andrew Stanton as Crush, a green sea turtle.
 Sigourney Weaver as herself, who voices the recorded messages broadcast over the institute's public address system.
 Bill Hader as Stan, a kelp bass and husband fish.
 Kate McKinnon as Inez, Stan's wife fish.
 Alexander Gould as Passenger Carl, a delivery truck driver who works for the institute. Gould previously voiced Nemo in Finding Nemo.
 Torbin Xan Bullock as Gerald, a California sea lion, who wants to lie on the rock occupied by Fluke and Rudder only to be constantly repelled by them.
 Katherine Ringgold as Kathy, a chickenfish.
 Bennett Dammann as Squirt, Crush's son. He was previously voiced by Nicholas Bird in Finding Nemo.
 John Ratzenberger as Husband Crab (Bill)
 Angus MacLane as Sunfish "Charlie Back-and-Forth"
 Willem Dafoe as Gill, a Moorish idol and the leader of the "Tank Gang."
 Brad Garrett as Bloat, a pufferfish.
 Allison Janney as Peach, a starfish.
 Austin Pendleton as Gurgle, a royal gramma.
 Stephen Root as Bubbles, a yellow tang.
 Vicki Lewis as Deb and Flo, a four-striped damselfish.
 Jerome Ranft as Jacques, a cleaner shrimp. He was originally voiced by Joe Ranft, Jerome's late brother, in Finding Nemo.

Production 
Prior to work on Finding Dory, Disney had planned to make a Finding Nemo sequel without Pixar's involvement, through Circle 7 Animation, a studio Disney announced in 2005 with the intention to make sequels to Pixar properties. However, due to the 2006 acquisition of Pixar by Disney, Circle 7 was shut down by Disney without ever having produced a film. Although it never went into production, a script for the Circle 7 version was uploaded to the official Raindance Film Festival website. Elements of the unmade script included the introduction of Nemo's long-lost twin brother, Remy, and a storyline wherein Marlin is caught and must be saved.

In July 2012, Andrew Stanton was announced as the director of a Finding Nemo sequel, with Victoria Strouse writing the script. That same month, Stanton examined the veracity of the news involving the potential sequel. That August, Ellen DeGeneres had entered negotiations to reprise her role of Dory, and in September, the film was confirmed by Stanton, saying: "What was immediately on the list was writing a second Carter movie. When that went away, everything slid up. I know I'll be accused by more sarcastic people that it's a reaction to Carter not doing well, but only in its timing, but not in its conceit." In February 2013, it was confirmed by the press that Albert Brooks would reprise the role of Marlin in the sequel.

In April 2013, Disney announced the sequel, Finding Dory, confirming that DeGeneres and Brooks would be reprising their roles as Dory and Marlin, respectively. Following a long campaign for a sequel on The Ellen DeGeneres Show, DeGeneres stated:

In a July 2013 interview with Los Angeles Times, Stanton spoke of the sequel's origin: "There was polite inquiry from Disney [about a Finding Nemo sequel]. I was always 'No sequels, no sequels.' But I had to get on board from a VP standpoint. [Sequels] are part of the necessity of our staying afloat, but we don't want to have to go there for those reasons. We want to go there creatively, so we said [to Disney], 'Can you give us the timeline about when we release them? Because we'd like to release something we actually want to make, and we might not come up with it the year you want it.

In a 2016 interview, Stanton stated how the film's story came to be; "I don't watch my films that often after they're done because I have to watch them so many times before they come out. So about 2010 when we were getting Finding Nemo ready for the 10-year re-release in 3D, it was interesting to watch again after all that time. Something kind of got lodged in the back of my brain and started to sort of stew. I started to think about how easily Dory could get lost and not find Marlin and Nemo again. She basically was in the same state that she was when Marlin found her. I didn't know where she was from. I knew that she had spent most of her youth wandering the ocean alone, and I wanted to know that she could find her new family, if she ever got lost again. It's almost like the parental side of me was worried." Stanton additionally stated: "I knew if I ever said Finding Dory or mentioned a sequel to Finding Nemo out loud, I'd be done, [T]here would be no way I'd be able to put that horse back in the barn. So I kept it very quiet until I knew I had a story that I thought would hold, and that was in early 2012. So I pitched it to John Lasseter and he was all into it. Then I got a writer, and once we had a treatment that we kind of liked, I felt comfortable calling Ellen."

Stanton selected Victoria Strouse to write the screenplay. She later said, "It was always collaborative with Andrew, but really the screenwriting was me. Of course, Andrew would do passes, and he and I would brainstorm a lot together and then we would bring it to the group of story artists. People would weigh in and share ideas." She pointed to Dory's forgetfulness as a challenge when writing the script, adding, "You don't realize until you sit down to write a character who can't remember things how integral memory is to absolutely everything we do, and that's what creates a narrative that people can follow. When a main character can't self-reflect and can't tell a story, that character is very difficult to design because she can't really lead. To get her to be able to lead and to get an audience to be able to trust her was the hardest thing to do."

The fictional Marine Life Institute depicted extensively in the film is based on the production team's research trips to the Monterey Bay Aquarium, the Marine Mammal Center and the Vancouver Aquarium.

The film's ending was revised after Pixar executives viewed Blackfish, a 2013 documentary film which focuses on the dangers of keeping orca whales in captivity. Initially, some of the characters were to end up in a SeaWorld-like marine park, but the revision gave them an option to leave.

Angus MacLane was one of the first people to whom Stanton revealed his idea for the sequel. Together, with Bob Peterson, they discussed about different ideas for places Dory would visit during her journey — one of those ideas was the touch pool sequence. Later, during the Brave (2012) wrap party, Stanton invited MacLane to join him in his first co-directing duty. Stanton described MacLane's role as a "jack of all trades", particularly utilizing his experience in animation and story, as well as in production, having created a few short films himself.

In August 2015, at Disney's D23 Expo, it was announced that Hayden Rolence would voice Nemo, replacing Alexander Gould from the first film, whose voice had deepened since reaching adulthood (Gould voiced a minor character in the sequel instead). At the D23 expo they also announced that Ed O'Neill would be the voice of Hank.

To make the light more realistic, RenderMan was completely re-engineered, its biggest change in 25 years.

Music 

The film's soundtrack was composed by Thomas Newman and released on June 17, 2016. Louis Armstrong's version of "What a Wonderful World" is played during the scene in which fish are released into the ocean as the truck Dory and Hank are driving crashes into the water. On May 20, 2016, Sia performed a cover of Nat King Cole's "Unforgettable" on The Ellen DeGeneres Show following an announcement that it would be featured in the film.

Release

Theatrical 
Finding Dory premiered on June 8, 2016, at the El Capitan Theatre in Los Angeles. The film was originally scheduled for general release on November 25, 2015, but it was pushed back to June 17, 2016. In theaters, Finding Dory was accompanied by a short film, Piper (2016). The film was re-released for Labor Day Weekend on September 2.

Home media 
Walt Disney Studios Home Entertainment released Finding Dory for digital release on October 25, 2016, and on Blu-ray (2D and 3D) and DVD on November 15. Physical copies contain behind-the-scenes featurettes, audio commentary, deleted scenes, and two shorts: Piper and Marine Life Interviews; it featured interviews with the inhabitants of the Marine Life Institute about their encounters with Dory. The film made a revenue of $91.5 million from home media sales with 5.5 million units sold, making it the second best-selling title of 2016 behind Star Wars: The Force Awakens. Finding Dory was released on 4K Ultra HD Blu-ray on September 10, 2019.

Reception

Box office 
Finding Dory earned $486.3 million in the United States and Canada and $542.3 million in other countries, for a worldwide total of $1.029 billion. It was the third-highest-grossing film of 2016 and the fourth-highest-grossing animated film of all time. It had a worldwide opening of $185.7 million, which is the sixth-biggest of all time for an animated film, and an IMAX global opening of $6.4 million. On August 16, it earned $900million in ticket sales, and on October 9, it passed the $1billion threshold. Deadline Hollywood calculated the film's net profit as $296.6 million, accounting for production budgets, marketing, talent participations, and other costs; box office grosses and home media revenues placed it fourth on their list of 2016's "Most Valuable Blockbusters".

North America 
The film was released with Central Intelligence on June 17, 2016, in 4,305 theaters: 3,200 in 3D, approximately 100 in IMAX, and 425 in premium large format. Finding Dory earned $55million on its first day, including $9.2million from Thursday night previews—a record for both Pixar and any animated film. It was Fandango's top pre-selling animated film of all time, outselling the previous record-holder, Minions (2015). The film debuted earning $135.1million, a record for the highest opening weekend for an animated film, which was 93.8% above Finding Nemos $70.3 million debut. Finding Dory also had the second-highest June opening weekend, behind Jurassic World. It further broke the record for the biggest PLF and Cinemark XD opening for an animated film with $10.4 million and $2.6 million, respectively. In IMAX, it made $5 million from 211 theaters, the third-best animated IMAX opening behind Zootopia ($5.2 million) and Toy Story 3 ($8.4 million).

Following its record-breaking openings, it scored the biggest Monday for Pixar by grossing $19.6 million (breaking Toy Story 3s $15.6 million) and the best Monday in June for an animated film. However, among all animated films, it is ranked second—behind 2004's Shrek 2, which made $23.4 million on its first Monday, and it is also the biggest Tuesday for an animated film with $23.2 million, besting Minions $16.8 million. It jumped 18.5% over its Monday gross, a rare achievement for a film. It crossed the $200 million mark in its first seven days, becoming the first (and fastest) animated film to pass this milestone in just a week. It fell only 46% in its second weekend earning $73 million to record the biggest second weekend for an animated film (breaking Shrek 2s $72.2 million previous record), the biggest for Disney and 2016 (surpassing Captain America: Civil Wars $72.6 million), and the eighth-biggest second weekend gross of all time overall. This was despite facing stiff competition from newcomer Independence Day: Resurgence. It crossed $300 million in 12 days—a new record for an animated film, surpassing the previous record held by Shrek 2 and Toy Story 3 (both of which took 18 days), and became the second animated film of 2016 (after Zootopia), the fourth Disney film of 2016, and the sixth overall film of the year to cross the milestone. It continued to dominate the box office for the third straight weekend, despite competitions from three new wide releases—The Legend of Tarzan, The Purge: Election Year, and fellow Disney release The BFG—after witnessing a 42% decline to $41.8 million in three days and $51.4 million in four days, respectively, during the Independence Day holiday frame. This made it the second time in two years and just the third time since 1992, the July 4 holiday box office was topped by a film in its third weekend of release. It broke another record as it passed the $400 million mark in 21 days, which is the fastest for an animated film, the fastest of 2016, the fastest for the studio, and the fifth-fastest of all time overall. Moreover, it became the second film of 2016 (after Captain America: Civil War), the fifth animated film, the ninth film for the studio, and the twenty-fourth film overall to pass the milestone. On the following day (July 8), it became the highest-grossing film of the year in the United States and Canada. It dropped out of the top ten in its eighth week.

Although the film was finally overtaken by The Secret Life of Pets (and The Legend of Tarzan in second place) in its fourth weekend, it nevertheless passed The Lion King to become the highest-grossing Disney animated film of all time in the same weekend, surpassing the latter which held the record for 15 non-consecutive years. In just 30 days, it overtook Shrek 2 ($441.2 million) to become the highest-grossing animated film of all time, breaking the latter's record of 12 years. Four days later, on July 20, it became the first-ever animated film in cinematic history to cross the $450 million mark. As with its predecessor Finding Nemo, the studio expanded the theater count for the film during Labor Day Weekend from 345 to 2,075.

Outside North America 
Worldwide, Finding Dory received a staggered release in a span of four months from June to September, with Germany being the last country. This was done in order to take advantage of key holidays and competitive dates around the world. It made an estimated $50.7million in its opening weekend in 29 countries. In its second weekend, it added $38.7 million from 37 markets, falling in third place behind Independence Day: Resurgence and Now You See Me 2. In the same weekend along with its $73 million take in North America, the film helped Pixar cross the $10 billion mark worldwide since Toy Story (1995). By its fourth weekend, the animated film helped Disney push past the $3 billion mark internationally and $5 billion globally.

It had the biggest opening for an animated film in Brazil ($7.1 million) and the Netherlands ($2.1 million), and the biggest of all time for a Disney animated or Pixar film in Australia ($7.7 million), the Philippines ($2.1 million), Singapore ($1.3 million), India ($1 million), Indonesia, Peru and Central America, and in Russia it opened with $3.2 million, and the second-biggest in the United Kingdom and Ireland ($10.7 million), Mexico ($9.4 million) and Argentina ($3.5 million), and Colombia ($2.1 million), behind Monsters University. In the UK and Ireland, the film recorded the second-biggest animated opening of the year with £8.1 million ($10.7 million) from 580 theaters, behind only The Secret Life of Pets. However, if previews are excluded, Finding Dory is ahead. Moreover, it also posted the second-biggest Disney/Pixar opening, behind only Toy Story 3 (fourth-biggest if previews are included), and the seventh-biggest animated opening of all time overall based on pure Friday-to-Sunday gross alone. It added an additional 43 theaters in its second weekend, after which it added another £3.98 million ($5.1 million) at the weekend, thereby passing the £20 million mark in just 10 days (among Pixar films, only Toy Story 3 reached £20 million faster). It made an impressive £8.15 million during weekdays, from Monday to Thursday resulting in a £2.03 million daily-average gross. According to The Guardian, this was because of the school holidays that prevailed on the weekdays. Otherwise, family films earn the vast majority of their takings on Saturday and Sunday, and showtimes typically reduce on weekdays. It returned to the top of the box office in its fourth weekend and went on to become the highest-grossing film of the summer that year. In Brazil, in addition to recording the biggest Disney/Pixar opening ever, almost twice the previous record held by The Good Dinosaur, it also set a new record for an all-time animated opening, on par with Minions in local currency. In South Korea, it had the biggest opening for a Pixar film with $7.1 million, which is also the second-biggest for a Disney animated film, behind Frozen. In Japan, the film had a two-day weekend opening of $7 million on Saturday and Sunday from 511 screens on 571,000 admissions. For the entire three-day holiday weekend, including Marine Day on Monday July 18, the film earned $11 million on 922,000 admissions. This made it the top western release of the weekend and the biggest foreign opening-weekend in the country of that year. It had further number-one openings in Spain ($4.9 million), France ($4.7 million), Hong Kong ($1.9 million; $2.8 million including previews), Taiwan ($1.9 million), Sweden, Norway, and Denmark. It topped the box office in the Netherlands for three and in Spain and Australia for four consecutive weekends. In Italy, it scored the biggest animated opening of the year with $5.8 million.

In China, where Pixar films have been struggling to find broad audiences and accrue lucrative revenues, the film was projected to make around $30 million in its opening weekend. The film ended up grossing $17.7 million—the highest Pixar opening in the country's history—debuting in second place behind Warcraft. It surpassed Monsters University in just seven days to become the biggest Pixar film there with $38.1 million. It opened in Germany—its last market—on September 29, where the film delivered a robust opening of $8.4 million, the biggest for any film of 2016 in the country. The film continued to benefit from German Unity Day on October 3. It went on to top the box office there for three straight weekends, tying with Inferno in its third weekend.

It is now the highest-grossing Disney animated or Pixar film in Australia (where it is also the second-highest-grossing animated film of all time behind Shrek 2), Bolivia, Brazil, Central America, Colombia, India, Indonesia, New Zealand, Peru, the Philippines, and Trinidad. It also became the second-highest-grossing Pixar release of all time in South Korea behind Inside Out. Elsewhere, the film's top international markets were Japan ($66 million), followed by the UK ($56.3 million), China ($38.1 million), Australia ($36.3 million), and Brazil ($34.5 million).

Critical response 
Its critical consensus reads, "Funny, poignant, and thought-provoking, Finding Dory delivers a beautifully animated adventure that adds another entertaining chapter to its predecessor's classic story." Metacritic, which uses a weighted average, assigned Finding Dory a score of 77 out of 100 based on 48 critics, indicating "generally favorable reviews". Audiences polled by CinemaScore gave the film an average grade of "A" on an A+ to F scale, and PostTrak reported a 91% overall positive score and an 81% "definite recommend" among kids.

Mike Ryan of Uproxx wrote, "I never thought I wanted a sequel to Finding Nemo, but here we are and I'm pretty happy it exists. And, for me, it was a more emotional experience than the first film. Finding Dory got me—it made me cry." A. O. Scott of The New York Times said that while the film lacks "dazzling originality", it still has "warmth, charm and good humor". In his review for Variety, Owen Gleiberman wrote, "It's a film that spills over with laughs (most of them good, a few of them shticky) and tears (all of them earned), supporting characters who are meant to slay us (and mostly do) with their irascible sharp tongues, and dizzyingly extended flights of physical comedy." Joe Morgenstern of The Wall Street Journal said that "Finding Dory can be touching, sweet and tender, but it's compulsively, preposterously and steadfastly funny." Peter Travers of Rolling Stone gave the film three-and-a-half stars out of four and said that the film "brims with humor, heart and animation miracles", despite lacking "the fresh surprise of its predecessor". Wendy Ide of The Observer wrote that the film "reprises the central motif of Finding Nemo: that of the enduring parent-child bond, and the special embrace of family, in all its permutations", but added: "it is approached with such charm and warmth that it hardly matters that the two films share such similar arcs."

Todd McCarthy of The Hollywood Reporter wrote, "Its heroine may suffer from short-term memory loss, but viewers with any memory at all will realize that Finding Dory falls rather short of its wondrous progenitor." Writing for the Los Angeles Times, Kenneth Turan said that, "As the 13-year gap between Nemo and Dory indicates, this was not a concept that cried out to be made." Armond White of National Review wrote: "For anyone who is not a legally bound babysitter, Finding Dory offers nothing that will please a taste for finer humor, freer fun, or genuinely expressive filmmaking."

Environmental controversies and issues 
Conservationists warned that, very much like Finding Nemo, the film could lead to uninformed customers buying regal blue tang fish, Dory's species, for home aquariums. Blue tangs cannot be bred in captivity and have to be caught in the wild. They are related to surgeonfish and exhibit razor-sharp spines on both sides of the tail that can inflict formidable wounds.

While promoting the film, actress Ellen DeGeneres reminded audiences that Nemo and Dory's real-life home, the Great Barrier Reef, is under enormous threat, mostly due to coral bleaching, a process induced by climate change, which has killed coral reefs on an enormous scale.

Accolades

Possible sequel 
Discussions of a sequel began in June 2016, as Stanton announced his intent to have approaches to worldbuilding across sequels similar to the Toy Story franchise, given the introduction of new characters.

See also 
 Finding Nemo (franchise)

Notes

References

External links 

  at Disney
  at Pixar
 
 

2010s adventure comedy films
2010s American animated films
2010s children's adventure films
2010s children's animated films
2010s children's comedy films
2010s English-language films
2016 3D films
2016 computer-animated films
American adventure comedy films
American buddy comedy films
American children's animated adventure films
American children's animated comedy films
American computer-animated films
American nonlinear narrative films
American sequel films
Animated buddy films
Animated films about fish
Fictional fish
Films about amnesia
Films about disability
Films directed by Andrew Stanton
Films scored by Thomas Newman
Animated films set in California
Films set in aquariums
Film spin-offs
Finding Nemo
IMAX films
Pixar animated films
Films with screenplays by Andrew Stanton
Walt Disney Pictures animated films
3D animated films
2016 comedy films